This is a list of the Disney animated series broadcast in Italy.

# 
The 7D 24+ episodes, 2014
101 Dalmatians 65 episodes, 1997

A 
Adventures of the Gummi Bears 95 episodes, 1985
Aladdin 86 episodes, 1994
American Dragon: Jake Long 52 episodes, 2005

B 
Bonkers 65 episodes, 1993
Braceface 78 episodes, 2001
Brandy & Mr. Whiskers 39 episodes, 2004
Buzz Lightyear of Star Command 62 episodes, 2000

C 
Chip 'n Dale Rescue Rangers 65 episodes, 1989

D 
Darkwing Duck 91 episodes, 1991
Dave the Barbarian 22 episodes, 2004
Dinosaurs 65 episodes, 1991
Doug 117 episodes, 1991
DuckTales 100 episodes, 1987

E 
The Emperor's New School 52 episodes, 2006

F 
Fillmore! 25 episodes, 2005
Fish Hooks 46+ episodes, 2010

G 
Gargoyles 78 episodes, 1994
Goof Troop 79 episodes, 1992

H 
Hercules 65 episodes, 1998
House of Mouse 53 episodes, 2001

J 
Jake and the Never Land Pirates 43+ episodes, 2011
Jungle Cubs 21 episodes, 1996

K 
Kim Possible 87 episodes, 2002
Kick Buttowski: Suburban Daredevil 52 episodes, 2010

L 
The Legend of Tarzan 39 episodes, 2001
Lilo & Stitch 65 episodes, 2003
The Little Mermaid 31 episodes, 1992

M 
The Buzz on Maggie 21 episodes, 2005
Handy Manny 42+ episodes, 2006
Marsupilami 13 episodes, 1993
Mickey Mouse Clubhouse 90+ episodes, 2006
Monster Allergy 57 episodes, 2005
My Friends Tigger & Pooh 38 episodes, 2007

N 
The New Adventures of Winnie the Pooh 83 episodes, 1988

P 
PB&J Otter 65 episodes, 1998
Pepper Ann 65 episodes, 1997
Phineas and Ferb 222 episodes, 2007
The Book of Pooh 36 episodes, 2001
The Proud Family, 53 episodes, 2001

Q 
Quack Pack 39 puntate, 1996

R 
Recess 84 episodes, 1997

S 
Special Agent Oso 62 episodes, 2008
Star vs the Force of Evil 13+ episodes 2015

T 
TaleSpin 65 episodes, 1990
Timon and Pumbaa 168 episodes, 1995

W 
Wander Over Yonder 79 episodes, 2013
The Wuzzles 13 episodes, 1985
W.I.T.C.H. 52 episodes, 2004

See also 
Walt Disney Company
The Walt Disney Company Italy

Programs broadcast by Disney Italy
Disney programs broadcast in Italy